The 1987–88 NBA season was the Detroit Pistons' 40th season in the NBA and 31st season in the city of Detroit.  The team played at the Pontiac Silverdome in surburban Pontiac, Michigan.

The Pistons finishing with a then franchise-best record of 54–28 (.659), 1st place in the NBA Central Division. the first division championship for the franchise since moving to Detroit in 1957.  In the 1988 NBA Playoffs, they defeated the Washington Bullets 3–2 in the first round, Michael Jordan and the Chicago Bulls 4–1 in the semifinals, and then Larry Bird and the top-seeded Boston Celtics 4–2 in the Conference Finals. They would advance to the NBA Finals for the first time since 1956 when the team was based in Fort Wayne, only to lose to the defending and eventual NBA champion Los Angeles Lakers in a hard fought 7-game series.

Game 6 saw a remarkable performance, as Pistons star Isiah Thomas went down with a gruesome ankle injury. On the sidelines, camera shots displayed the critical condition of Thomas’s foot, as he could barely fit his shoe back on, but Thomas insisted on playing. Hobbling badly for the rest of the game, the Pistons guard put on a show, scoring 25 points in the third quarter, and 43 points in the game.

In the closing seconds, with the Pistons ahead, there was a controversial call on Pistons center Bill Laimbeer. Lakers center Kareem Abdul-Jabbar feinted over his right shoulder to the middle, then pivoted to his left for his classic sky hook along the baseline.  Laimbeer raised his hands straight above his head to show he wasn’t fouling and yet was called for what Laker coach Pat Riley would call a "phantom foul."  The Pistons lost 103–102 as Abdul-Jabbar made both free throws, and then, with a very limited Thomas for game 7, the Lakers took the title with a 108–105 victory in Los Angeles.  Pistons owner Bill Davidson said, "Well, the worst loss was out in LA when I was in the room with David Stern getting ready to accept the trophy, and they call a foul on Bill Laimbeer against Kareem. Bill pulled down a clean rebound, and Hugh Evans calls a foul. You know that he was set up, and you know … I don’t say he had a bet on the game, but that was … that was unconscionable! And that cost us a championship, which we should have had. Which we had."

Detroit was led on the season by Thomas (19.5 ppg, 8.4 apg, NBA All-Star), forward Adrian Dantley (20.0 ppg), and guard Joe Dumars (14.2 ppg).  As the season came to a close, Game 5 of Finals was the franchise's last game at the Pontiac Silverdome, as they would move to another Detroit-area suburban arena, the purpose-built Palace of Auburn Hills, the following season.

Birth of the Bad Boys
The Pistons of this era became known as the Bad Boys.  At the start of the 1987–88 season, Al Davis, owner of the Los Angeles Raiders of the NFL sent Raiders merchandise to the Pistons to acknowledge the shared view of the teams and their physical style of play.  Dan Hauser, Pistons Vice-President of Marketing said, "Al sent us Raiders sweaters, and when we played Golden State in Oakland, Al had Raiders warm-ups for us with our names and numbers on them.  The rough bad-boy fighting style of the Raiders fits our image. That`s why, at our home games at the Palace, you see a sea of black: black caps, black T-shirts, black sweatshirts".

The end of season video yearbook produced by the Pistons was titled Bad Boys, with a connection to the 1983 movie, and the Bad Boys name came into being.  The Pistons players embraced the rough and tumble image, Nintendo released Bill Laimbeer's Combat Basketball, a futuristic basketball game without rules, without fouls, and weapons are permitted, the Pistons marketed around the Bad Boys identity, and Detroit fan embraced the blue-collar identity.  Pistons guard Joe Dumars said, "You can't be great in this league and have zero identity".  
 
The positive view of the team was not universal with Michael Jordan declaring "“the Bad Boys are bad for basketball,” later adding "I hated them.  And that hate carries even to this day."  David Stern, Commissioner of the NBA at the time, said, "If I had it to do over again, we would be more aggressive in regulating, shall we say, that style of play, because it led to our game becoming much more physical".

Jalen Rose, who later starred as a member of the Fab Five at Michigan, embraced the Bad Boys brand as a teenager growing up in Detroit, stating  “I loved everything about the Bad Boys. I loved how they played and how they didn’t back down.  They just went out and kicked the other teams’ butts.”  Pistons announcer George Blaha said, "I think the people of Detroit and all across Michigan loved the Pistons’ don’t-back-down-ever mentality. Detroit’s a working person’s town and that’s the same type of fan that you have all across the state of Michigan from the big cities to the small towns. Never does a day go by that somebody that I talk to doesn’t bring up the Bad Boys; they loved ‘em".

Draft picks

Roster

Regular season

Season standings

Record vs. opponents

Game logs

Regular season

|-style="background:#cfc;"
| 1 || November 6, 19877:30 PM EST || New York
| W 110–99
|
|
|
| Pontiac Silverdome28,676
| 1–0
|-style="background:#fcc;"
| 2 || November 7, 19879:00 PM EST || @ Milwaukee
| L 105–119
|
|
|
| MECCA Arena11,052
| 1–1
|-style="background:#fcc;"
| 3 || November 10, 19877:30 PM EST || @ Indiana
| L 118–121
|
|
|
| Market Square Arena11,885
| 1–2
|-style="background:#cfc;"
| 4 || November 13, 19877:30 PM EST || @ Philadelphia
| W 113–94
|
|
|
| The Spectrum12,302
| 2–2
|-style="background:#cfc;"
| 5 || November 14, 19877:30 PM EST || @ Cleveland
| W 128–113
|
|
|
| Richfield Coliseum10,157
| 3–2
|-style="background:#fcc;"
| 6 || November 18, 19877:30 PM EST || Philadelphia
| L 109–113
|
|
|
| Pontiac Silverdome17,445
| 3–3
|-style="background:#cfc;"
| 7 || November 20, 19877:30 PM EST || Golden State
| W 131–108
|
|
|
| Pontiac Silverdome20,362
| 4–3
|-style="background:#cfc;"
| 8 || November 21, 19878:30 PM EST || @ Chicago
| W 144–132 (OT)
|
|
|
| Chicago Stadium18,466
| 5–3
|-style="background:#cfc;"
| 9 || November 24, 19878:00 PM EST || @ Houston
| W 97–83
|
|
|
| The Summit16,611
| 6–3
|-style="background:#fcc;"
| 10 || November 25, 19878:30 PM EST || @ Dallas
| L 107–113
| Dumars (19)
| Rodman (10)
| Thomas (15)
| Reunion Arena17,007
| 6–4
|-style="background:#cfc;"
| 11 || November 27, 19877:30 PM EST || San Antonio
| W 143–111
|
|
|
| Pontiac Silverdome30,743
| 7–4
|-style="background:#fcc;"
| 12 || November 28, 19877:30 PM EST || @ Washington
| L 102–124
|
|
|
| Capital Centre13,028
| 7–5

|-style="background:#cfc;"
| 13 || December 1, 19877:30 PM EST || @ New Jersey
| W 124–115 (OT)
|
|
|
| Brendan Byrne Arena8,232
| 8–5
|-style="background:#cfc;"
| 14 || December 2, 19877:30 PM EST || Milwaukee
| W 115–105
|
|
|
| Pontiac Silverdome18,780
| 9–5
|-style="background:#cfc;"
| 15 || December 4, 19877:30 PM EST || Boston
| W 128–105
|
|
|
| Pontiac Silverdome34,523
| 10–5
|-style="background:#cfc;"
| 16 || December 8, 19877:30 PM EST || Portland
| W 127–117
|
|
|
| Pontiac Silverdome17,126
| 11–5
|-style="background:#cfc;"
| 17 || December 11, 19877:30 PM EST || Washington
| W 114–108
|
|
|
| Pontiac Silverdome17,884
| 12–5
|-style="background:#cfc;"
| 18 || December 12, 19877:30 PM EST || New York
| W 124–96
|
|
|
| Pontiac Silverdome21,368
| 13–5
|-style="background:#cfc;"
| 19 || December 15, 19878:00 PM EST || Chicago
| W 127–123 (OT)
|
|
|
| Pontiac Silverdome23,729
| 14–5
|-style="background:#cfc;"
| 20 || December 18, 19877:30 PM EST || Dallas
| W 117–112
| Dantley (28)
| Laimbeer (15)
| Johnson (11)
| Pontiac Silverdome19,426
| 15–5
|-style="background:#cfc;"
| 21 || December 25, 198712 Noon EST || @ New York
| W 91–87
|
|
|
| Madison Square Garden14,549
| 16–5
|-style="background:#cfc;"
| 22 || December 26, 19877:30 PM EST || New Jersey
| W 110–75
|
|
|
| Pontiac Silverdome23,330
| 17–5
|-style="background:#fcc;"
| 23 || December 29, 19877:30 PM EST || Houston
| L 91–101
|
|
|
| Pontiac Silverdome26,498
| 17–6
|-style="background:#cfc;"
| 24 || December 30, 19877:30 PM EST || @ Indiana
| W 105–95
|
|
|
| Market Square Arena12,945
| 18–6

|-style="background:#fcc;"
| 25 || January 2, 19887:30 PM EST || Denver
| L 142–151
|
|
|
| Pontiac Silverdome23,746
| 18–7
|-style="background:#fcc;"
| 26 || January 5, 19888:00 PM EST || @ Atlanta
| L 71–81
|
|
|
| The Omni16,451
| 18–8
|-style="background:#cfc;"
| 27 || January 6, 19887:30 PM EST || Atlanta
| W 90–87
|
|
|
| Pontiac Silverdome25,749
| 19–8
|-style="background:#fcc;"
| 28 || January 8, 19888:00 PM EST || L.A. Lakers
| L 104–106
| Dantley, Dumars (25)
| Laimbeer, Mahorn (11)
| Thomas (10)
| Pontiac Silverdome40,278
| 19–9
|-style="background:#fcc;"
| 29 || January 13, 19887:30 PM EST || @ Boston
| L 105–143
|
|
|
| Boston Garden14,890
| 19–10
|-style="background:#cfc;"
| 30 || January 15, 19887:30 PM EST || Cleveland
| W 97–93
|
|
|
| Pontiac Silverdome19,622
| 20–10
|-style="background:#fcc;"
| 31 || January 16, 19888:30 PM EST || @ Chicago
| L 99–115
|
|
|
| Chicago Stadium18,676
| 20–11
|-style="background:#cfc;"
| 32 || January 18, 19884:00 PM EST || @ Denver
| W 123–116
|
|
|
| McNichols Sports Arena13,004
| 21–11
|-style="background:#cfc;"
| 33 || January 20, 19889:30 PM EST || @ Utah
| W 120–117
|
|
|
| Salt Palace12,212
| 22–11
|-style="background:#fcc;"
| 34 || January 22, 198810:30 PM EST || @ Seattle
| L 106–109
|
|
|
| Seattle Center Coliseum14,737
| 22–12
|-style="background:#fcc;"
| 35 || January 24, 198810:00 PM EST || @ Portland
| L 111–119
|
|
|
| Memorial Coliseum12,666
| 22–13
|-style="background:#cfc;"
| 36 || January 27, 19887:30 PM EST || Indiana
| W 103–86
|
|
|
| Pontiac Silverdome19,801
| 23–13
|-style="background:#cfc;"
| 37 || January 29, 19888:00 PM EST || Boston
| W 125–108
|
|
|
| Pontiac Silverdome61,983
| 24–13
|-style="background:#fcc;"
| 38 || January 30, 19887:30 PM EST || @ New Jersey
| L 104–116
|
|
|
| Brendan Byrne Arena11,894
| 24–14

|-style="background:#fcc;"
| 39 || February 1, 19887:30 PM EST || @ Cleveland
| L 83–94
|
|
|
| Richfield Coliseum10,636
| 24–15
|-style="background:#cfc;"
| 40 || February 2, 19888:30 PM EST || @ Milwaukee
| W 99–97
|
|
|
| MECCA Arena11,052
| 25–15
|-style="background:#fcc;"
| 41 || February 4, 19887:30 PM EST || @ New York
| L 93–100
|
|
|
| Madison Square Garden14,363
| 25–16
|-style="background:#cfc;"
| 42 || February 9, 19888:30 PM EST || @ Chicago
| W 89–74
|
|
|
| Chicago Stadium17,846
| 26–16
|-style="background:#cfc;"
| 43 || February 10, 19887:30 PM EST || New York
| W 98–87
|
|
|
| Pontiac Silverdome19,160
| 27–16
|-style="background:#cfc;"
| 44 || February 12, 19888:00 PM EST || Atlanta
| W 108–92
|
|
|
| Pontiac Silverdome35,884
| 28–16
|-style="background:#cfc;"
| 45 || February 13, 19887:30 PM EST || Chicago
| W 82–73
|
|
|
| Pontiac Silverdome40,369
| 29–16
|-style="background:#cfc;"
| 46 || February 15, 19887:30 PM EST || Philadelphia
| W 102–95
|
|
|
| Pontiac Silverdome21,530
| 30–16
|-style="background:#cfc;"
| 47 || February 18, 19887:30 PM EST || Seattle
| W 108–95
|
|
|
| Pontiac Silverdome24,482
| 31–16
|-style="background:#fcc;"
| 48 || February 19, 19889:00 PM EST || @ Milwaukee
| L 108–119
|
|
|
| MECCA Arena11,052
| 31–17
|-style="background:#fcc;"
| 49 || February 21, 19883:30 PM EST || @ L.A. Lakers
| L 110–117
| Thomas (42)
| Laimbeer (14)
| Thomas (10)
| The Forum17,505
| 31–18
|-style="background:#cfc;"
| 50 || February 23, 198810:30 PM EST || @ Sacramento
| W 121–105
|
|
|
| ARCO Arena10,333
| 32–18
|-style="background:#cfc;"
| 51 || February 24, 198810:30 PM EST || @ Golden State
| W 107–93
|
|
|
| Oakland-Alameda County Coliseum Arena14,340
| 33–18
|-style="background:#cfc;"
| 52 || February 26, 19887:30 PM EST || New Jersey
| W 137–109
|
|
|
| Pontiac Silverdome25,334
| 34–18
|-style="background:#cfc;"
| 53 || February 28, 198812:00 PM EST || Boston
| W 106–101
|
|
|
| Pontiac Silverdome37,462
| 35–18

|-style="background:#cfc;"
| 54 || March 1, 19887:30 PM EST || @ Atlanta
| W 117–104
|
|
|
| The Omni16,451
| 36–18
|-style="background:#cfc;"
| 55 || March 2, 19887:30 PM EST || L.A. Clippers
| W 103–90
|
|
|
| Pontiac Silverdome16,554
| 37–18
|-style="background:#fcc;"
| 56 || March 5, 19887:30 PM EST || @ Washington
| L 97–101
|
|
|
| Capital Centre15,656
| 37–19
|-style="background:#cfc;"
| 57 || March 6, 19887:00 PM EST || Milwaukee
| W 109–99
|
|
|
| Pontiac Silverdome24,751
| 38–19
|-style="background:#fcc;"
| 58 || March 8, 19887:30 PM EST || @ Indiana
| L 104–117
|
|
|
| Market Square Arena13,220
| 38–20
|-style="background:#cfc;"
| 59 || March 9, 19887:30 PM EST || Utah
| W 103–98
|
|
|
| Pontiac Silverdome20,623
| 39–20
|-style="background:#cfc;"
| 60 || March 11, 19887:30 PM EST || Phoenix
| W 116–88
|
|
|
| Pontiac Silverdome21,612
| 40–20
|-style="background:#cfc;"
| 61 || March 12, 19887:30 PM EST || Cleveland
| W 104–100
|
|
|
| Pontiac Silverdome33,854
| 41–20
|-style="background:#cfc;"
| 62 || March 14, 19887:30 PM EST || Sacramento
| W 109–97
|
|
|
| Pontiac Silverdome16,909
| 42–20
|-style="background:#cfc;"
| 63 || March 17, 19887:30 PM EST || @ Cleveland
| W 102–99
|
|
|
| Richfield Coliseum13,261
| 43–20
|-style="background:#cfc;"
| 64 || March 20, 19887:00 PM EST || Washington
| W 118–110
|
|
|
| Pontiac Silverdome22,075
| 44–20
|-style="background:#cfc;"
| 65 || March 22, 19887:30 PM EST || Indiana
| W 123–104
|
|
|
| Pontiac Silverdome18,645
| 45–20
|-style="background:#fcc;"
| 66 || March 25, 19888:30 PM EST || @ San Antonio
| L 106–107
|
|
|
| HemisFair Arena8,596
| 45–21
|-style="background:#cfc;"
| 67 || March 26, 19889:30 PM EST || @ Phoenix
| W 108–103
|
|
|
| Arizona Veterans Memorial Coliseum14,025
| 46–21
|-style="background:#fcc;"
| 68 || March 28, 198810:30 PM EST || @ L.A. Clippers
| L 100–102
|
|
|
| Los Angeles Memorial Sports Arena12,156
| 46–22
|-style="background:#fcc;"
| 69 || March 30, 19887:30 PM EST || Atlanta
| L 102–103
|
|
|
| Pontiac Silverdome47,692
| 46–23

|-style="background:#fcc;"
| 70 || April 1, 19888:00 PM EST || @ Boston
| L 110–121
|
|
|
| Boston Garden14,890
| 46–24
|-style="background:#fcc;"
| 71 || April 3, 19881:30 PM EDT || Chicago
| L 110–112
|
|
|
| Pontiac Silverdome23,712
| 46–25
|-style="background:#cfc;"
| 72 || April 5, 19887:30 PM EDT || @ New Jersey
| W 125–108
|
|
|
| Brendan Byrne Arena11,586
| 47–25
|-style="background:#cfc;"
| 73 || April 8, 19887:30 PM EDT || @ Philadelphia
| W 96–86
|
|
|
| The Spectrum15,164
| 48–25
|-style="background:#cfc;"
| 74 || April 9, 19887:30 PM EDT || @ Atlanta
| W 115–102
|
|
|
| The Omni16,451
| 49–25
|-style="background:#fcc;"
| 75 || April 11, 19887:30 PM EDT || @ New York
| L 111–114 (OT)
|
|
|
| Madison Square Garden13,312
| 49–26
|-style="background:#cfc;"
| 76 || April 13, 19887:30 PM EDT || Cleveland
| W 115–98
|
|
|
| Pontiac Silverdome18,808
| 50–26
|-style="background:#cfc;"
| 77 || April 15, 19888:00 PM EDT || Milwaukee
| W 92–91
|
|
|
| Pontiac Silverdome27,126
| 51–26
|-style="background:#cfc;"
| 78 || April 16, 19887:30 PM EDT || New Jersey
| W 114–96
|
|
|
| Pontiac Silverdome22,767
| 52–26
|-style="background:#fcc;"
| 79 || April 19, 19887:30 PM EDT || @ Boston
| L 110–121
|
|
|
| Boston Garden14,890
| 52–27
|-style="background:#cfc;"
| 80 || April 21, 19887:30 PM EDT || @ Washington
| W 99–87
|
|
|
| Capital Centre11,713
| 53–27
|-style="background:#fcc;"
| 81 || April 22, 19887:30 PM EDT || Indiana
| L 98–103
|
|
|
| Pontiac Silverdome27,881
| 53–28
|-style="background:#cfc;"
| 82 || April 24, 19887:00 PM EDT || Philadelphia
| W 128–118
|
|
|
| Pontiac Silverdome27,854
| 54–28

Playoffs

|- align="center" bgcolor="#ccffcc"
| 1 || April 28, 19887:30 PM EDT || Washington
| W 96–87
| Isiah Thomas (34)
| Bill Laimbeer (12)
| Joe Dumars (6)
| Pontiac Silverdome17,356
| 1–0
|- align="center" bgcolor="#ccffcc"
| 2 || April 30, 19888:00 PM EDT || Washington
| W 102–101
| Isiah Thomas (30)
| Bill Laimbeer (11)
| Joe Dumars (5)
| Pontiac Silverdome18,293
| 2–0
|- align="center" bgcolor="#ffcccc"
| 3 || May 2, 19888:00 PM EDT || @ Washington
| L 106–114 (OT)
| Isiah Thomas (29)
| Bill Laimbeer (8)
| Isiah Thomas (8)
| Capital Centre9,673
| 2–1
|- align="center" bgcolor="#ffcccc"
| 4 || May 4, 19888:00 PM EDT || @ Washington
| L 103–106
| Dantley, Rodman (23)
| Bill Laimbeer (10)
| Isiah Thomas (10)
| Capital Centre10,513
| 2–2
|- align="center" bgcolor="#ccffcc"
| 5 || May 8, 19883:30 PM EDT || Washington
| W 99–78
| Joe Dumars (20)
| Bill Laimbeer (11)
| Isiah Thomas (11)
| Pontiac Silverdome18,403
| 3–2
|-

|- align="center" bgcolor="#ccffcc"
| 1 || May 10, 19888:30 PM EDT || Chicago
| W 93–82
| Adrian Dantley (23)
| Bill Laimbeer (14)
| Isiah Thomas (8)
| Pontiac Silverdome18,312
| 1–0
|- align="center" bgcolor="#ffcccc"
| 2 || May 12, 19888:00 PM EDT || Chicago
| L 95–105
| Isiah Thomas (25)
| Bill Laimbeer (14)
| Isiah Thomas (13)
| Pontiac Silverdome20,281
| 1–1
|- align="center" bgcolor="#ccffcc"
| 3 || May 14, 19881:00 PM EDT || @ Chicago
| W 101–79
| Vinnie Johnson (23)
| Bill Laimbeer (10)
| Isiah Thomas (11)
| Chicago Stadium18,676
| 2–1
|- align="center" bgcolor="#ccffcc"
| 4 || May 15, 19883:30 PM EDT || @ Chicago
| W 96–77
| Adrian Dantley (24)
| Bill Laimbeer (13)
| Isiah Thomas (11)
| Chicago Stadium18,676
| 3–1
|- align="center" bgcolor="#ccffcc"
| 5 || May 18, 19888:30 PM EDT || Chicago
| W 102–95
| Isiah Thomas (25)
| Bill Laimbeer (13)
| Isiah Thomas (9)
| Pontiac Silverdome21,371
| 4–1

|- align="center" bgcolor="#ccffcc"
| 1 || May 25, 19888:00 PM EDT || @ Boston
| W 104–96
| Isiah Thomas (35)
| Rick Mahorn (10)
| Isiah Thomas (12)
| Boston Garden14,890
| 1–0
|- align="center" bgcolor="#ffcccc"
| 2 || May 26, 19888:00 PM EDT || @ Boston
| L 115–119 (2OT)
| Isiah Thomas (24)
| John Salley (12)
| Isiah Thomas (11)
| Boston Garden14,890
| 1–1
|- align="center" bgcolor="#ccffcc"
| 3 || May 28, 19883:30 PM EDT || Boston
| W 98–94
| Joe Dumars (29)
| John Salley (9)
| Isiah Thomas (6)
| Pontiac Silverdome26,481
| 2–1
|- align="center" bgcolor="#ffcccc"
| 4 || May 30, 19883:00 PM EDT || Boston
| L 78–79
| Bill Laimbeer (29)
| three players tied (8)
| Isiah Thomas (7)
| Pontiac Silverdome26,625
| 2–2
|- align="center" bgcolor="#ccffcc"
| 5 || June 1, 19888:00 PM EDT || @ Boston
| W 102–96 (OT)
| Isiah Thomas (35)
| John Salley (9)
| Dumars, Thomas (5)
| Boston Garden14,890
| 3–2
|- align="center" bgcolor="#ccffcc"
| 6 || June 3, 19889:00 PM EDT || Boston
| W 95–90
| Vinnie Johnson (24)
| Bill Laimbeer (9)
| Isiah Thomas (9)
| Pontiac Silverdome38,912
| 4–2

|- align="center" bgcolor="#ccffcc"
| 1 || June 7, 19889:00 PM EDT || @ L.A. Lakers
| W 105–93
| Dantley (34)
| Laimbeer (7)
| Thomas (12)
| The Forum17,505
| 1–0
|- align="center" bgcolor="#ffcccc"
| 2 || June 9, 19889:00 PM EDT || @ L.A. Lakers
| L 96–108
| Dantley (19)
| Laimbeer, Mahorn (9)
| Thomas, Dumars (7)
| The Forum17,505
| 1–1
|- align="center" bgcolor="#ffcccc"
| 3 || June 12, 19883:30 PM EDT || L.A. Lakers
| L 86–99
| Thomas (28)
| Rodman (12)
| Thomas (9)
| Pontiac Silverdome39,188
| 1–2
|- align="center" bgcolor="#ccffcc"
| 4 || June 14, 19889:00 PM EDT || L.A. Lakers
| W 111–86
| Dantley (27)
| Thomas (9)
| Thomas (12)
| Pontiac Silverdome34,297
| 2–2
|- align="center" bgcolor="#ccffcc"
| 5 || June 16, 19889:00 PM EDT || L.A. Lakers
| W 104–94
| Dantley (25)
| Laimbeer (11)
| Thomas (8)
| Pontiac Silverdome41,372
| 3–2
|- align="center" bgcolor="#ffcccc"
| 6 || June 19, 19883:30 PM EDT || @ L.A. Lakers
| L 102–103
| Thomas (43)
| Laimbeer (9)
| Dumars (10)
| The Forum17,505
| 3–3
|- align="center" bgcolor="#ffcccc"
| 7 || June 21, 19889:00 PM EDT || @ L.A. Lakers
| L 105–108
| Dumars (25)
| Salley (10)
| Thomas (7)
| The Forum17,505
| 3–4

NBA Finals

Game 1

The Pistons had just dispatched the Celtics in six games, while the Lakers were coming off back-to-back seven-game wins over the Utah Jazz and Dallas Mavericks. The Lakers were tired, and it showed. Adrian Dantley scored 34 points, hitting 14 of 16 shots from the field. The Pistons took control of the game with six seconds left in the first half when Bill Laimbeer hit a 3-point shot to put the Pistons up 54–40. Kareem Abdul-Jabbar then fired an inbound pass intended for Byron Scott, but it was intercepted by Isiah Thomas who let fly with another three-pointer which went in at the halftime buzzer. The Pistons had a 57–40 halftime lead and never looked back, stealing Game 1 with a 105–93 win.

Game 2

Facing the possibility of going down 2–0 with three games to play in Detroit, the veteran Lakers found resolve with a 108–96 win.  James Worthy led the Lakers with 26 points, Byron Scott had 24, and Magic Johnson 23 despite battling the flu.

Game 3

With Magic still battling the flu, the Lakers got a key win in Detroit, 99–86, to go up 2–1 in games.  The Lakers took control of the game in the third period, outscoring the Pistons 31–14.  Despite his illness, Magic had 18 points, 14 assists, and six rebounds.

Game 4

With pride in front of their home fans, the Pistons tied the series at 2–2 with a 111–86 blowout win.  The Pistons decided to attack the basket and make Magic Johnson defend.  Johnson wound up on the bench early in the second half with foul trouble.

With Magic out of the game, the Pistons built a substantial lead. During timeouts, Bill Laimbeer was almost frantic. He kept saying, "No letup! We don't let up!" They didn't, and blew out the defending NBA champions by 25 points.

Left open by the trapping Lakers defense, Dantley led the team with 27 points. Vinnie Johnson came off the bench to add 16 while James Edwards had 14 points and five rebounds off the bench.

Game 5

The Pistons' 104–94 victory was a perfect farewell to the Pontiac Silverdome. "I told Joe Dumars with a minute left in the game to look around and enjoy this because you'll never see anything like it again," Laimbeer said. "Forty-one thousand people waving towels and standing. It was awesome."

The Lakers opened Game 5 with a fury of physical intimidation, scoring the game's first 12 points. But that approach soon backfired, as the Laker big men got into foul trouble.

Dantley played a major role in the turnaround, scoring 25 points, 19 of them in the first half, to rally the Pistons to a 59–50 halftime lead.  Vinnie Johnson added 12 of his 16 points in the first half to keep Detroit moving.

Joe Dumars added 19 points on 9-of-13 shooting to send the Pistons back to Los Angeles, one win away from their first NBA title.

Game 6

This game turned out to be a classic confrontation between a team hungry for their first title (Detroit) and a veteran team with their backs to the wall (the Lakers).

The Lakers led 56–48 in the third quarter when Isiah Thomas suddenly began a classic performance.  He scored the game's next 14 points, hitting two free throws, a driving layup, four jump shots, and a running bank shot.

On the Pistons' next possession, Thomas stepped on Michael Cooper's foot, rolled his ankle, and had to be helped from the floor.  Despite a severe sprain, Thomas returned to the game 35 seconds later and continued his dizzying onslaught.  By the end of the third quarter, Thomas had scored 25 points, an NBA Finals record for one quarter, on 11-of-13 shooting. This helped the Pistons gain an 81–79 lead.

The Pistons' momentum carried into the final period as they led 102–99 with a minute left.  Byron Scott cut the lead to one with a 14-footer in the lane with 52 seconds remaining.  The Lakers then turned up the defense on the Pistons' next possession, forcing Thomas into a desperation 18-footer.  Forty-one-year-old Kareem Abdul-Jabbar then got the ball on the Lakers' trip down the floor and posted up Bill Laimbeer for his signature skyhook.  As Kareem shot, Laimbeer was whistled for a foul, even though replays showed he barely touched Kareem.  Jabbar then coolly sank the two free throws to put the Lakers up 103–102.  The lead held up as Thomas, bad ankle and all, missed another shot at the buzzer.

Thomas would end up with 43 points and eight assists, but it was for naught as the series moved to Game 7.

Game 7
One of the best NBA Finals in recent memory closed out with another classic.

Thomas' ankle was still sore, as evidenced by his limping badly in warmups.  He did manage to play the first half, scoring 10 points and leading the Pistons to a 52–47 halftime lead.  But, the delay between halves caused the ankle to stiffen, and Thomas could not continue.  With Isiah on the bench, the Lakers turned the halftime deficit into a 90–75 lead late in the 4th quarter.

Chuck Daly then went to a faster lineup with Dennis Rodman, John Salley, Joe Dumars, and Vinnie Johnson that created matchup problems for the Lakers and enabled the Pistons to score at a torrid pace.  With 3:52 left, Salley canned two free throws to cut the Laker lead to 98–92, sending the Forum fans into a panic.

With 1:17 left, Dumars hit a jump shot to cut the lead to 102–100.  Magic Johnson then hit a free throw after a Rodman foul to put the Lakers up by three.  On the Pistons' next trip down the floor, Rodman took an ill-advised jumper with 39 seconds left. Byron Scott rebounded and was fouled. His two free throws pushed the lead to 105–100.

After Dumars made a layup, James Worthy hit a free throw and Bill Laimbeer canned a three-pointer, pushing the score to 106–105 with six seconds showing.  A. C. Green completed the scoring with a layup off a length-of-the court pass from Magic, making it 108–105, and although the Pistons got the ball to Thomas at midcourt with a second remaining, he fell without getting off a shot.

Worthy racked up a monster triple-double: 36 points, 16 rebounds and 10 assists. For that and his earlier efforts in the series, he was named the Finals MVP.

External links
 Detroit Pistons on Database Basketball
 Detroit Pistons on Basketball Reference

References

Det
Detroit Pistons seasons
Eastern Conference (NBA) championship seasons
Detroit Pistons
Detroit Pistons